Two-time defending champion Steffi Graf defeated Jana Novotná in the final, 7–6(8–6), 1–6, 6–4 to win the ladies' singles tennis title at the 1993 Wimbledon Championships. It was her fifth Wimbledon singles title and 13th major title overall.

Seeds

  Steffi Graf (champion)
  Martina Navratilova (semifinals)
  Arantxa Sánchez Vicario (fourth round)
  Gabriela Sabatini (quarterfinals)
  Mary Joe Fernández (third round)
  Conchita Martínez (semifinals)
  Jennifer Capriati (quarterfinals)
  Jana Novotná (final)
  Anke Huber (fourth round)
  Magdalena Maleeva (third round)
  Manuela Maleeva-Fragnière (second round)
  Katerina Maleeva (first round)
  Mary Pierce (withdrew)
  Amanda Coetzer (second round)
  Helena Suková (quarterfinals)
  Nathalie Tauziat (fourth round)

Mary Pierce withdrew due to illness. She was replaced in the draw by lucky loser Louise Field.

Qualifying

Draw

Finals

Top half

Section 1

Section 2

Section 3

Section 4

Bottom half

Section 5

Section 6

Section 7

Section 8

References

External links

1993 Wimbledon Championships on WTAtennis.com
1993 Wimbledon Championships – Women's draws and results at the International Tennis Federation

Women's Singles
Wimbledon Championship by year – Women's singles
Wimbledon Championships